Isla Guachinanga is a small island located in Santurce, San Juan, Puerto Rico.

The island, which has a number of trees and ecological areas, was reportedly littered with trash as of 2013.

Isla Guachinanga is near Barrio Obrero and Residencial Las Casas.

References

Islands of Puerto Rico